Taulant Marku (born 14 June 1994 in Pukë) is an Albanian football player who currently plays for Korabi in the Albanian First Division.

References

1994 births
Living people
People from Pukë
Association football forwards
Albanian footballers
Shkëndija Tiranë players
KF Tërbuni Pukë players
KS Kastrioti players
KF Korabi Peshkopi players
Kategoria Superiore players
Kategoria e Parë players
Kategoria e Tretë players